The Palace of Sports Olimp, also known as Olimp Palace of Sport, Sports Palace Olimp and Olympus Arena is a sports complex in Krasnodar, Russia. Its 6,000 square metres contains fitness rooms, conference hall, food service areas and a 3,000 seat multi-purpose arena.

It is the home venue of volleyball club Dinamo Krasnodar (both men's team and women's team) and handball clubs Kuban Krasnodar and SKIF Krasnodar. It used to be the home venue of basketball club PBC Lokomotiv-Kuban before they move to a larger venue in 2011.

See also
Basket-Hall Krasnodar

References

External links
 Arena picture

Indoor arenas in Russia
Volleyball venues in Russia
Basketball venues in Russia
Buildings and structures in Krasnodar
Sport in Krasnodar